The Cameron County Courthouse is a historic building located at 1150 East Madison Street in Brownsville, Cameron County, Texas. It was designed by architect Atlee B. Ayres in the Classical Revival style of architecture. Built between 1912 and 1914 by Gross Construction Company as the second court house of Cameron County, it served as such until 1914 when the 1979 courthouse was completed in the 900 block of East Harrison Street. Its relatively plain exterior belies the grandeur of the art glass dome above its central rotunda. On September 27, 1980, it was added to the National Register of Historic Places. Between 1994 and 2006, the building was completely renovated at a cost of over $17 million. It was rededicated on October 17, 2006. Sometimes called the Dancy Building in honor of County Judge Oscar Cromwell Dancy, who championed its construction in 1912, it now houses the Cameron County Court at Law No. 1 as well as county offices.

The building also housed offices and a low-income clinic during the 1980s.

See also

Cameron County Courthouse (1882)
National Register of Historic Places listings in Cameron County, Texas
Recorded Texas Historic Landmarks in Cameron County

References

External links

Courthouses on the National Register of Historic Places in Texas
Neoclassical architecture in Texas
Government buildings completed in 1914
Buildings and structures in Brownsville, Texas
County courthouses in Texas
Atlee B. Ayres buildings
National Register of Historic Places in Cameron County, Texas
Recorded Texas Historic Landmarks